The Hairdresser is a 2010 German comedy film directed by Doris Dörrie.

Cast 
 Gabriela Maria Schmeide as Kathi
 Natascha Lawiszus as Julia
 Ill-Young Kim as Tien
 Christina Große as Silke
 Rolf Zacher as Joe
  as Centerleiterin
 Maren Kroymann as Frau Krieger

References

External links 

2010 comedy films
2010 films
German comedy films
2010s German films